Bucculatrix oncota is a moth in the family Bucculatricidae. It was described by Edward Meyrick in 1919. It is found in India.

References

Bucculatricidae
Moths described in 1919
Taxa named by Edward Meyrick
Moths of Asia